Malyshevo is a rural locality (a selo) in Malyginskoye Rural Settlement, Kovrovsky District, Vladimir Oblast, Russia. The population was 74 as of 2010.

Geography 
Malyshevo is located on the Uvod River, 11 km northwest of Kovrov (the district's administrative centre) by road. Kislyakovo is the nearest rural locality.

References 

Rural localities in Kovrovsky District